Tina Scott Polsky (born May 4, 1968) is an American politician serving as a Democratic member of the Florida Senate, representing the 29th district since 2020.  Her Senate district includes parts of southern Palm Beach and northern Broward counties. Polsky also served one term in the Florida House of Representatives, representing parts of western and southern Palm Beach County from 2018 to 2020.

Electoral history
In 2018, Polsky was elected without opposition to Florida House District 81. After Senator Kevin Rader announced he would retire in 2020, Polsky ran to succeed him. She defeated former State Representative Irving Slosberg in the Democratic primary, 69% to 31%.  Polsky then beat her Republican opponent, Brian Norton, 56% to 44% to win election to the Florida Senate, District 29.

Endorsements 
During her 2020 election, Polsky was endorsed by the following organizations:

Legislation 
In 2019, Polsky co-sponsored CS/HB 49, the "Dignity for Incarcerated Women Act." The bill requires the jails and prisons to provide certain hygiene products to women at no cost, including tampons. The bill also prohibits male correctional officers from conducting pat-down or body cavity searches on female inmates, among other prohibitions.  She also co-sponsored CS/HB 563, which requires that individuals cannot be disqualified from receiving reemployment assistance if he or she leaves their job as a direct result of domestic violence. Polsky opposed the effort to repeal the Reedy Creek Improvement Act, arguing that Disney is being "attacked" for expressing support for its LGBTQ customers and employees, asking whether the decision to repeal the law and dissolve the Reedy Creek Improvement District is being made "based on spite."

In 2022, Polsky co-sponsored SB 292, that requires hospitals or other state-licensed birthing facilities to administer and process a test on any newborn who fails an initial hearing test in order to screen for Congenital Cytomegalovirus (CMV). She also co-sponsored SB 528/HB 265, that increases the maximum value of a motor vehicle that may be exempted from legal process in a bankruptcy case from $1,000 to $5,000. She co-sponsored SB 968 that safeguarded retirement accounts by making sure that money in certain kinds of retirement accounts which is received by individuals after a divorce settlement remains exempt from creditor claims once the transfer is complete. The bill clarifies that any interest in an individual retirement account (IRA) or individual retirement annuity received in a transfer incident to divorce remains exempt from creditor claims after the transfer is complete.

References

|-

1968 births
21st-century American Jews
21st-century American politicians
21st-century American women politicians
Jewish American state legislators in Florida
Polsky, Tina
Living people
Women state legislators in Florida